One Life is the seventh studio album by Japanese recording artist Mai Kuraki. It was released on January 1, 2008. The album is Kuraki's first under the Northern Music label.

Background
One Life is Kuraki's second self-produced album. Unlike her previous albums where she worked almost exclusively with Aika Ohno and Akihito Tokunaga, for One Life Kuraki sought out various Being musicians to participate in the production of the album. The sound is reminiscent of her earlier, more R&B-driven albums such as Delicious Way and Perfect Crime.

Chart performance
One Life debuted on the Oricon albums chart at #14 with 62,662 copies sold (due to two weeks' sales combination), making it Kuraki's first album to open/peak outside of the top 10. The album charted for a total of 11 weeks. One Life was the 117th best selling album of 2008.

Track listing

Charts

Certifications

Release history

References

External links

2008 albums
Mai Kuraki albums
Being Inc. albums
Japanese-language albums
Albums produced by Daiko Nagato